Pyrausta tithonialis is a moth in the family Crambidae. It was described by Zeller in 1872. It is found in Russia, China, Korea and Japan.

Subspecies
Pyrausta tithonialis tithonialis
Pyrausta tithonialis bashkirica Slamka, 2013 (Russia: southern Urals)
Pyrausta tithonialis caucasica Slamka, 2013 (Russia: Central Caucasus)
Pyrausta tithonialis latiplagalis Caradja, 1934 (China: Guangdong)

References

Moths described in 1872
tithonialis
Moths of Asia